"Only Love Can Break a Heart" is a popular song from 1962, performed by the American singer-songwriter Gene Pitney. The song was written by Hal David (words) and Burt Bacharach (music) and appears on Pitney's second album Only Love Can Break a Heart.

Gene Pitney version
Pitney had enjoyed some success as a songwriter prior to breaking through as a performer in his own right. He wrote the songs "Hello Mary Lou", "Rubber Ball", and "He's a Rebel", the last a number-one Billboard Hot 100 hit for The Crystals in 1962. Ironically, Pitney's success as a singer was beginning at that time, and, on November 3, 1962, "He's a Rebel" kept "Only Love Can Break a Heart", Pitney's highest charting hit, at No. 2 for one week, from topping the Billboard Hot 100 chart. The song also spent two weeks at No. 1 on the Billboard Easy Listening chart in October and November 1962, while reaching No. 2 on New Zealand's "Lever Hit Parade". Pitney did his own whistling on the song.

Chart performance

Country music versions
Country music singers Sonny James and Kenny Dale also recorded cover versions of "Only Love Can Break a Heart". Both versions reached the Top 10 on the Billboard Hot Country Singles chart during the 1970s. James' version peaked at No. 2 in March 1972, held out of the top by Freddie Hart's "My Hang-Up Is You." As a result, "Only Love ..." just missed continuing James' record-breaking streak of consecutive number-one singles, which had reached 16. Dale's version of the song reached number seven on the Hot Country Singles chart in 1979 and it was his biggest hit on the country charts.

Other versions
Margaret Whiting charted with the song in 1967. Whiting's version reached No. 96 on the Billboard Hot 100 and No. 4 on Billboard's Easy Listening chart.

Bobby Vinton released the song in 1977, and it reached No. 99 on the Billboard Hot 100, while reaching No. 44 on Billboard's Easy Listening chart, and No. 50 on the RPM "Adult Oriented Playlist" in Canada. Vinton's version appears on his album The Name Is Love.

Dionne Warwick released her version of the song as a single in 1977, but it only reached No. 9 on the "Bubbling Under" portion of the Billboard Hot 100, as well as No. 46 on Billboard's Adult Contemporary Charts.

In 1999, Glen Campbell recorded the song on his album My Hits and Love Songs.

See also
List of number-one adult contemporary singles of 1962 (U.S.)

References

External links
Single release info at discogs.com

1962 singles
1977 singles
Gene Pitney songs
Sonny James songs
Bobby Vinton songs
Dionne Warwick songs
Kenny Dale songs
Glen Campbell songs
Songs with lyrics by Hal David
Songs with music by Burt Bacharach
Musicor Records singles
Arista Records singles
1962 songs